Cultura Tres is a band with a history of defiance and perseverance that started more than a decade ago in the small town of Maracay, Venezuela. The band had been until then a DIY powerhouse that steadily gained the respect of the South-American sludge-doom scene. During the sludge-doom era of the band, guitarist brothers Alejandro and Juanma Montoya brought out a number of independent releases, but despite various musical highlights such as touring Europe, Japan and South-America or being declared “Discovery of the month” by Metal Hammer UK, the early aspirations of the Montoya’s would lack the resources and team members to reach the next level. A number of financial challenges and even personal tragedy would eventually put years of silence to the their musical output.

The early efforts of the brothers wouldn’t go totally unnoticed by recognised musicians and publications though. Cultura Tres would be mentioned and even featured despite its unsigned status. Magazines such as; Burrn (Japan), Decibel (USA) would praise the band’s originality and bands such as Sepultura and Lamb of God would often be seen wearing Cultura Tres t-shirts during live performances.

Noticing the prevalent interest in the rarity of these early DIY releases, the Montoya’s re-gained the energy to ignite a new Cultura Tres, this time within a team with similar aspirations, and with a renewed artistic vision. A new vision of what South-American heavy music should sound like.

In 2019 after hearing about the plans for a new Cultura Tres, old friend Paulo Xisto Pinto Jr. (bass player of the almighty Sepultura), surprised the brothers by offering to join in. And who better than Paulo to help shape a sound representing South-American metal? Of course Alejandro and Juanma were honoured and happy to welcome him on board. Soon after, the first demo sessions took place in a studio in Amsterdam where the three musicians explored new ideas and found a musical common ground. The resulting style retained elements of the psychedelic-sludgy past, but incorporated the groove of a more metal oriented vibe that Paulo brought in with his Sepultura influence. After these sessions it became clear that the 4th member of the band had to be not only skilled but also familiar with South-American grooves, and since the driving force behind Cultura Tres was now friendship and artistic view, it made Jerry Vergara Cevallos an obvious choice. Jerry, a Venezuelan-Colombian drummer and close friend, was an exceptional performer who shared the same obsession with creating metal with a new twist. He was delighted with the demos and joined immediately.

During the following three years and despite of the pandemic, Cultura Tres would go deep in the making of their last album “Camino de Brujos” (Trail of Witches), an album that explores new and old musical textures; the power of thrash-metal with the eeriness of sludge and the melancholic feel of classic rock, all through the scope of organic and realistic recordings, evoking the way heavy rock sounded before “over producing” became a thing.

After all these years of making music, Cultura Tres has become Latin America's most recognized and perhaps strangest brother to the sludge metal movement and it is indisputable that this four-piece has independently developed a distinctive sound, an avant-garde mix of metal, seventies rock, doom, psychedelia and South American folk.

Members
Current members
 Alejandro Londoño Montoya – guitar and vocals
 Juanma de Ferrari Montoya – guitar and backing vocals
 Paulo Xisto Pinto Jr. – bass (2019 – current)
 Jerry Vergara Cevallos – drums (2019 – current)

Former members
 Marcel Capell – bass (2007)
 Darrell Laclé – bass (2007 – 2008 – 2017 – 2018)
 David Abbink – drums (2007–2013)
 Benoit Martiny – drums (2014–2018)
 Alonso Milano Mendoza – bass – drums (2008 – 2018)

Discography
 Seis – 2007 (EP)
 La Cura – 2008 (album)
 El Mal Del Bien – 2011 (album)
 Rezando Al Miedo – 2013 (album)
 La Secta – 2017 (album)
 Camino de Brujos – 2023 (album)

References

External links
 Official website
 Cultura Tres Archives

Sludge metal musical groups